The Story of Prince Sobur is an Indian fairy tale. It tells the story of a princess who summons into her room a prince named Sobur (Arabic: "Patience"), or variations thereof, by the use of a magical fan. The story contains similarities to the European (French) fairy tale The Blue Bird, with similar tales present in South Asia (India and Pakistan) and in Eastern Africa.

Summary
In a version of the story collected from Bengal, by Lal Behari Dey, The Story of Prince Sobur, the story begins with a question of the father (a merchant, in this) to his seven daughters: "By whose fortune do they get their living?". The youngest answers that her living is by her own fortune. Her father expels her from home and she has to live in the jungle. After a while, the seventh daughter becomes rich and shares her wealth with her father. The merchant has to travel abroad, but his ship does not move. He then remembers he forgot to ask his seventh daughter what to bring her. He does and she says: "Sobur" ("wait"). He takes it to mean a thing named Sobur, and goes on his journey. In the foreign country, whose prince is called Sobur, the prince gives the merchant a box with a magical fan and a looking glass, telling him the box contains the "Sobur". The merchant returns and gives his daughter the box. She opens it a few days later and fans herself with the fan. By doing so, Prince Sobur teleports into her room. They falls in love and agree to marry each other. On the wedding day, her sisters prepare the nuptial bed with glass powder from broken bottles. When Sobur lies down in bed, he becomes gravelly injured and is rushed back to his native country. His wife decides to return with him, by donning the disguise of a Sannyasi. On her wanderings, she rests by a tree where a pair of birds, Bihangama and Bihangami, has their nest. She protects their nest by killing a snake and they, in gratitude, reveal how she can cure her prince. The birds agree to take her there faster than by going on foot. At the end of the tale, she cures prince Sobur and he forgives his sisters-in-law.

Variants

Asia
Variants of the tale are reported by professor Lee Haring to exist in  Bengal and Afghanistan.

India
According to scholar A. K. Ramanujan, tale type ATU 432, "The Prince as Bird", is reported in "over 8 Indian variants", including Bengali, Hindi and Kannada.

In an Indian variant collected by Maive Stokes with the name The Fan Prince, the tale begins with a question of a king to his seven daughters: Who gives them food? The six elders answer that it is him; the youngest that it is God. The seventh daughter is expelled from home and has to fend for herself in the jungle. After an adventure, they reconcile. One day, he has to travel abroad and asks his daughters what presents they want: the six elders for silk dresses and jewels, and the youngest simply said "Sabr" ("wait"). Her father takes notice of the strange declaration, but promises to look for this "Sabr". He buys the material wishes for his daughters in the foreign country, but still hasn't found "Sabr". Curiously, the men at the bazar say their king's son is called Sabr. The first king visits Prince Sabr, explains the story and receives from the prince a box that is to be given to the seventh princess. The king returns home and gives the box to his daughter. After a month she opens it: inside a fan, which she uses and suddenly Prince Sabr himself appears before her. They agree to marry each other, and her father consents. On their wedding day, the princess's six other sisters, angry at their sister's luck, prepare the bed for the prince with glass powder to hurt him. It so happens and Sabr is badly hurt. He urges his wife to use the fan the wrong way to teleport him back to his kingdom, where he may improve his condition. She dreams he is still in pain and decides to do something about it: she disguises as a male yogi and goes to another jungle, where she hears the a parrot and a "mainá" conversing about the cure to the prince. The princess, as yogi, gives the cure to her husband and reveals she was the yogi.

In a variant collected in Western India by Putlibaï Wadia, Prince Sabar, the tale begins with the father, a Sultan, asking their seven daughters what they want him to bring from his journey. The youngest answers "Sabar" ("patience"). The father asks around for the thing named Sabar, and an old woman tells him about a stone named "Sabar stone". He buys the stone from the woman and gives to his daughter. The daughter cries about it at first, but resigns herself and polishes the stone every day. She notices that the stone is wearing away and inside a fan is hidden. She waves the fan and a prince named Sabar appears to her. One day, Sabar warns the princess against a possible ploy by the sisters. She pays no heed to it, and the sisters prepare his bed with glass powder. He is hurt by the glass and begs the princess to use the fan to teleport him back to his parents. The tale was translated into French by Loys Bruyere, and retold by Indian scholar A. K. Ramanujan, sourced from Gujarat.

In another variant, from Simla, The Power of Fate, a Rajah asks his six adult daughters about their fates, and the sixth answers her fate is in no one's hands. The rajah expels her from home and she has to fend for herself. With a bit of luck, she employs servants to build a new palace. Later, they reconcile and the rajah has to travel somewhere, but first asks his daughters what presents he can give them. The sixth daughter asks for a little box that he may find in his travels. This box is kept by a bunniah and hides a fan that contains the soul of a prince. The rajah buys the box and gives his daughter, who opens it and finds a fan inside. She waves the fan and the prince appears to her. They spend hours together. One day, she foolishly reveals the secret to her sisters, who conspire to hurt the prince: they put glass powder on a couch. The next time the prince comes to the princess's room, he lays on the couch to rest, and the bits of glass hurt him. He returns to his kingdom, and the princess decides to dress as a fakir to go on a pilgrimage. One day, she rests by a tree and hears an eagle and a parrot conversing about the prince's situation and a way to cure him. She follows the birds' instructions, cures the prince and reveals herself as his princess.

Andrew Lang published in his Olive Fairy Book a variant from Punjab, collected by Major Campbell. In this tale, titled Kupti and Imani, a king has two daughters, Kupti and Imani, and asks them about leaving their futures in his hands. Kupti agrees to her father' s sentiment, but Imani argues that she will make her own fortune. The king takes his daughter to be a crippled fakir's companion, and leaves her there. The fakir and the exiled princess fall into a routine: she takes care of the fakir and weaves clothes for him to sell in the market. With the money, she hires builders to build a beautiful house for them. The king finally concedes that his daughter Imani was right after all. One day, he has to go on a journey to the country of Dûr, but asks his daughters what they want. The king's messenger goes to asks Imani, but, since she is busy tending other matters, she says: "Patience". The messenger relays the information to her father, the king. In Dûr, the king asks about the "patience", but finds none. The news reach the ears of the king of Dûr, named Subbar Khan ("Subbar" meaning "patience"). Subbar Khan gives the king a casket that can only be open by Imani. The king takes the casket to his daughter and she opens it: inside, a fan. She waves the fan three times and king Subbar Khan appears before her. He explains that the fan is magical and can both summon him if waved, and send him back by folding it and tapping three times. Subbar Khan continues to visit Imani and the fakir, and Kupti, her sister, becomes interested in knowing more of him. On the occasion of a visit to Imani, Kupti sprinkles on his bed powdered and splintered glass laced with poison. Subbar Khan is badly hurt by the glass and poison and returns to his kingdom by the magic fan. Imani and the fakir notice his long absence, and she decides to go to Dûr to see him. On her way, she stops by a tree and hears two monkeys talking about the cure: berries from that very same tree. Imani takes he berries and goes to Dûr just in time to heal the prince.

In another tale, collected in Mirzapur from an old Muhammadan cookwoman with the title The Princess who got the gift of patience, a king with seven daughters asks them who they have confidence in. The six elders answer: in him. The youngest: in herself. The king banishes the youngest to the jungle. She finds a house in the jungle and lives there. One day, the king has to travel to another country and asks his daughters what they want as gifts. A servant goes to the youngest's house in the jungle to asks her the same question. The princess is bathing and tells the servant to have patience (sabar), for she is occupied. The servant relays the message to her father. Thus, the king asks around the marketplace in the foreign country for this "patience". An old woman says she has something wrapped in an dirty rag that she sells to the king. He brings it home to his daughter and gifts her. She is disappointed in the present, but years later she unwraps the dirty rag and finds a fan inside. She waves the fan and a prince appears before her. They fall in love. One day, her sisters pay her a surprise visit and, seeing the prince, conspire to hurt him. They take their glass bangles, grind them into powder and sprinkle it over the prince bed. The prince is badly injured and begs the princess to wave the fan to return him to his home. The princess dress up as a man and goes to the prince's palace. One night, she listens to the conversation between a parrot and a mainá on the events that transpired.

In a tale collected by Sunity Devi, Maharani of Coochbehar, with the title Sabar Karo, a king summons his three daughters to asks them a question. The elders answer that they love their father and are awarded with portions of the kingdom. However, the youngest answers truthfully, as her mother taught her: she may love her father now, but once she marries she will love her husband more. The king feels insulted and banishes her to the jungle. She has to fend for herself: though she was abandoned in the forest with a palki of food, she shares her food with the animals and the peacocks give her their feathers. She has an idea to make fans of the feathers and sell them. With the money, she hires workers to build her a palace. Some time later, her father, the king, unknowingly visits her kingdom and asks a servant if he can see her. The princess tells the maiden "Sabar karo" ("just wait"). Not knowning what it means, the servant leaves the palace, goes to another city and asks around for "Sabar karo". A shopkeeper sells her a golden box and she brings it back to her mistress. The princess opens the box and sees jewels, a looking-glass and at last a peacock feather fan. She uses the fan and a man appears before her. He introduces himself as a Maharajah. They set a date for their marriage and her family visits her. Her father, the king, and her mother, the Maharani, tell her that her elder sisters neglect them. Meanwhile, the two sister wander around the palace and, spurred by jealousy, try to ruin her happiness. On the nuptial night, the Maharajah lies on the bed and suddenly falls ill. He disappears. She uses the fan for months and he does not return, so she decides to seek him. She dresses in a plain sari and goes on a journey. One day, she stops by a tree and kills a snake that threatened a nest of little birds. The birds give her a herb she can use to cure the prince.

Scholar Ping-Chiu Yen published another Indian variant, where the princess tries to find her beloved Prince Sabr, and overhears a parrot and a mainá bird talking about the cure for the prince.

Pakistan
In a variant from Pakistan, the main character is named Princess Sabira and her love interest is Prince Sabar, who is summoned by the fan after her father returns from his travels.

Another variant from Pakistan was collected from the Sindh region, with the title Prince Sabr.

Pakistani writer and poet Shafi Aqeel published another version of the tale, titled Sabr ka pankha, in Urdu, which was translated into English as The Fan of Patience by writer Ahmad Bashir.

Africa
In a variant from the Hausa people, the heroine, Lahidi, is mistreated by her father and lives in a separate hut. When her father asks her what eh can bring her from the market, she answers "Ba-Komi" ("nothing"). Her father takes it to mean a thing named "Ba-Komi". He meets a man named "Ba-Komi" and when he goes home, tells his daughter that Ba-Komi shall meet her on a certain day. Ba-Komi comes and "alights on the roof" of her hut. Lahidi and Ba-Komi fall in love through repeated encounters. Lahidi's half-sister, suspecting something, puts thorns on the roof and, when Ba-Komi comes again, lands on the thorns and hurts himself. Lahidi discovers the ploy, shaves her head and disguises herself as a man to look for a cure for Ba-Komi, the King's Son. One day, deep in the forest, she stops by a Kainya tree and listens to the conversation of the Jipillima birds; one of them says their droppings can cure the king. Lahidi takes the dropping, brings them to Ba-Komi and heals him. The king's son pays the stranger with a ring, and visits Lahidi to kill her. Lahidi, now as herself, shows him the ring and they recognize each other.

In a tale sourced from the Swahili and titled Saburi Nisali, a Sultan has seven daughters. One day, each of the six elder daughters goes to the shamba to make love to the overseer and returns home. After they return home, the mirrors they own become blackened. The youngest daughter goes to the shamba, is not seduced by the overseer, returns home and her mirror is still clean. One day, their father, the sultan, visits his daughters and they trick their father with the youngest's clean mirror. When the sultan sees a blackened mirror, he thinks it belongs to his youngest daughter, and banishes her to a hut near their house. Some time later, the Sultan has to travel to Zanzibar, and wishes to bring presents to his seven daughters. The sultan sends a servant to ask his seventh daughter what present she might want. The daughter, being interrupted, shouts at the servant "Saburi Nisali" ("Wait while I say my prayers"). The servant tells the sultan about "Saburi Nisali" and he decides to bring it to his daughter. In Zanzibar, the sultan asks everyone about the "Saburi Nisali", until he enters a merchant's house and Saburi himself appears to him. The sultan suspects something amiss with his daughter's request, but Saburi assures it is not the case. At any rate, Saburi - himself a jinn - gives the sultan a wooden box and riches and a golden fan inside. The sultan returns home and gives his daughter the wooden box. The youngest daughter takes the fan and fans herself, and Saburi appears. He summons his Jinns to build them a house and asks the sultan for her hand in marriage. The Sultan answers that his seventh daughter is not a virgin, but Saburi reveals the trickery of the mirrors. The Sultan punishes his six elder daughters and consents with Saburi's proposal. Furious at the discovery, the six sisters convince their youngest to ask about Saburi's only way to die: not bullet, nor fire, nor water, but broken glass. The sisters spread powdered glass on the couple's bed, Saburi lies in it and is badly hurt. He vanishes back to his kingdom with his Jinns, leaving his human wife. The princess diguises herself as a man and journeys to find Saburi. One time, she stops by a tree, where two birds talk about the cure for Saburi's ailment: leaves from that very tree.

Southeast Africa
Professor Lee Haring noted that the Indian story of Prince Sabour also appears in Mayotte and Mauritius.

Mauritius
According to Sookdeo Bissoondoyal, at least three Mauritian variants have been registered from Indian immigrants.

In a variant collected by Charles Baissac (fr), Zistoire Sabour or Histoire de Sabour ("The Tale of Sabour"), before he leaves on a business trip, a rich merchant asks his three daughters what they want as a returning gift. The oldest wants a diamond necklace, the second a blue velvet dress, and the youngest says "Sabour" ("patience"). The servant relays the message to the merchant and he departs. The merchant asks about "Sabour", and an old woman says it is the name of the prince. Prince Sabour questions about the merchant's interest in him, and the merchant shows him the daughter's picture. Prince Sabour falls in love with her picture, and asks the merchant to give her 
a fan. Back home, the merchant gives her a box with the fan. When she waves the fan, the prince appears before her and proposes to her. Jealous of her happiness, the two sisters grind glass into powder and sprinkle it on Sabour's bed in their sister's chambers. Sabour and the third daughter marry, but their happiness is short-lived as the prince lies on the bed and the glass injures him. His wife uses the fan to send him home for safety. Seven months pass, and she reads on the paper that prince Sabour is terribly ill. The girl dresses up as a man, with a false beard and travels to his realm. On the way, she stops by a tree and overhears the conversations between two birds on how to cure prince Sabour. Baissac remarked that this tale came from India. Professor Haring remarks that the Mauritian tale indicates a process of creolization of the immigrant Indian population to the island nation.

Mayotte
In a variant from Mayotte collected by Claude Allibert from teller Mahamudu Abiamri, Swaburi n' Swali, a king has six daughters, the youngest named Fatima. He gives his daughters a mirror as proof of their obedience to him: if they disobey him, their mirrors will appears as clouded. One day, the five elders decide to go to the chigoma (a celebration), while Fatima is asleep at the palace. When the elders return, they swap Fatima's mirror for another one and try to pass off her mirror as their own. When their father checks on them, Fatima takes the exchanged mirror to her father, who breaks it into her face and expels her from home. Now homeless, Fatima finds shelter with an old woman who lives in a rock. Some time later, when her father wants to travel and bring presents to his daughters, his ship will not depart. A mwalimu (diviner) advises the king to ask Fatima what she wants as a gift. When his messenger asks her, she says "Swaburi n'swali" ("Wait, I'm going to pray first"). The messenger relays the message to the king, who asks around for this "Swaburi n'swali". He discovers that "Swaburi n'swali" is the name of another king's son. He meets the youth, who gives him a tree trunk to present Fatima with it. Fatima gets the tree trunk and, some time later, her elderly companion asks her to cut it open: inside, she finds pieces of gold, a fan and a letter from Prince Swaburi n'swali, telling her to use the fan to summon him to her presence. The prince appears to her, learns of her father's mistreatment of her, marries her and they live happily.

Analysis

Tale type
Folktale collectors and scholars have noted the similarities between the Indian tales and European tales about a bird prince. Mary Stokes recognized the motif of the glass powder on the bed as parallel to the shards on the window of the French tale by d'Aulnoy.<ref>Stokes, Maive. Indian fairy tales, collected and tr. by M. Stokes; with notes by Mary Stokes. London: Ellis and White. 1880. p. xxvi.</ref> Folklorists Johannes Bolte and Jiří Polívka grouped the Indian variants with other European tales that were classified by Antti Aarne as type 432, Der Königssohn als Vogel ("Prince as Bird").

Stith Thompson and Warren Roberts classified the Indian tales as type 432, "The Prince as Bird", in their Types of Indic Oral Tales. The Indian tales differ from the international variants in that the heroine's father brings her a fan, which she uses to summon the magical prince.

Role of the heroine
The female character of the Indian tale "The Princess who Got the Gift of Patience" can be considered a strong female character, with an active role in the story. In the same vein, Marilyn Jurich described the heroine of Prince Sabar as a trickster: she defies her father's system of values and beliefs, and offers him an honest opinion, despite being punished for it. She builds her own fortune and makes her own fate, just as she told her father. As the tale continues, she marries and heals her husband from an illness her sisters caused.

Motifs
These Indian tales contain the motif J1805.2.1, "Daughter says 'Sobur' ('Wait'); Father thinks it is a thing, finds Prince Sobur". The motif appears in tale type ATU 432, "The Prince as Bird", of the Aarne-Thompson-Uther Index.

The tales also contain the motif D1425.3., "Magic fan summons prince for heroine".

In some tales, the heroine passes by a King Lear''-type judgement (Motif H592), indexed as its own tale type in the Indian Tale Catalogue, AT 923B, "The Princess Who Was Responsible for Her Own Fortune".

See also
 The Blue Bird (fairy tale)
 The Canary Prince
 The Three Sisters (fairy tale)
 The Green Knight (fairy tale)
 The Feather of Finist the Falcon

References 

Indian fairy tales
Fictional princes
Indian literature
Female characters in fairy tales
ATU 400-459